Matthew Adrian Young Jr. (born January 31, 1946) is a former American football linebacker who played six seasons in the National Football League (NFL).  Young played college football for the University of Southern California (USC), and earned All-American honors.  The Philadelphia Eagles chose him in the third round of the 1968 NFL Draft, and he played professionally for the Eagles, Detroit Lions and Chicago Bears.

Young was born in Dublin, Ireland.  He attended Bishop Amat Memorial High School in La Puente, California, and played high school football for the Amat Lancers.

Young enrolled in the University of Southern California, where he played for the USC Trojans football team from 1965 to 1967.  
Following his 1967 senior season, he was recognized as a consensus first-team All-American.

He was drafted by the Philadelphia Eagles in the third round, 68th overall pick, of the 1968 NFL Draft, and he played for the Eagles for five seasons from 1968 to 1972.  He played part of the 1972 NFL season for the Detroit Lions, and played his last NFL season for the Chicago Bears in 1973.  During his six NFL seasons, he appeared in 52 regular season games, and started 24 of them.

He was also a member of The Hawaiians of the World Football League (WFL) in 1974.

References

External links
Just Sports Stats

1946 births
Living people
People from La Puente, California
Players of American football from California
American football linebackers
USC Trojans football players
Philadelphia Eagles players
Detroit Lions players
Irish players of American football
Chicago Bears players
The Hawaiians players
All-American college football players
Sportspeople from Dublin (city)
Sportspeople from Los Angeles County, California